Hugh Francis "Bob" O'Lone (ca 1836 – early January, 1871) was an American-born saloon keeper and political figure in Manitoba. He was a member of the Convention of Forty and served in the Legislative Assembly of Assiniboia. His last name also appears as Olone.

He was born in New York City, the son of Margaret O'Lone. In 1863, he joined the 170th New York Infantry. O'Lone took part in the defense of Washington during the American Civil War. His regiment later became part of the Army of the Potomac. He was wounded at Petersburg, Virginia and was discharged in January 1865 as captain of Company F. With two partners, O'Lone came to Portage la Prairie later that year.  He moved to Winnipeg after one of his partners was killed in a fight. O'Lone was later killed by a blow to the head with a revolver. It is believed that he was one of several persons killed by Canadian troops in retaliation for the execution of Thomas Scott.

References 

Year of birth uncertain
1871 deaths
Politicians from New York City
People of New York (state) in the American Civil War
Union Army soldiers
American emigrants to pre-Confederation Canada
Immigrants to pre-Confederation Manitoba
Members of the Legislative Assembly of Assiniboia